Fever is the third studio album by Welsh heavy metal band Bullet for My Valentine. Containing eleven tracks, the album was released on 26 and 27 April 2010 in the UK and in the US, respectively. The album sold 71,000 copies in the US and 21,965 in the UK in its first week of release to debut at position No. 3 on The Billboard 200 and No. 1 on Billboard's Rock and Alternative charts, making it the band's most successfully-charting record to date. Since its release, Fever has sold over 600,000 copies worldwide. It also went gold in the UK in late 2013.

Writing and recording
In early 2009, about a year after Bullet for My Valentine released their second studio album, Scream Aim Fire, the band started writing new material. In a March 2009 interview with Metal Hammer, Matthew Tuck stated that on previous albums he had written lyrics for the songs after the band had completed writing instrumental parts; but for Fever, Tuck had been writing both at the same time. Bullet for My Valentine originally entered the studio in April 2009 with producer Don Gilmore (best known for his work with Linkin Park and Good Charlotte) at Monmouth, Wales, and cancelled tour dates in South Africa to continue recording. The band took time off from recording in mid-2009 to perform on various tours including the 2009 Mayhem Festival. During the Mayhem Festival, Bullet for My Valentine included a new song to their live setlist. Following their tours, the band returned to studio to finish Fever. Recording was completed in December 2009, and Gilmore began tracking the album shortly thereafter in Malibu, California.

In a 12 March 2010 interview with UK's Metal Hammer magazine, Matthew Tuck stated about the writing and recording process for the new album:

Guitar Edge had an interview with some members of the band where Matthew Tuck talked about Fever:

Musical style
Although the band moved to more of a thrash metal sound with Scream Aim Fire, the album had abandoned the thrash metal sound from Scream Aim Fire to a more heavy metal sound although it did lack screams like Scream Aim Fire. However, the song "Bittersweet Memories" and its lyrics has been described as "more emo than metal".

Release and promotion
On 14 February 2010, the band offered a new track, "Begging for Mercy", for free download from their official website for a limited time.

The first and lead single for the US, "Your Betrayal", was set for release on 8 March 2010 to the radio; and, unexpectedly, was released early as a Digital 45 on iTunes along with the track "Begging for Mercy" on 2 March 2010.

The second and lead single for the UK, "The Last Fight", was released on 19 April 2010 to the radio and a limited edition 7" single on 17 April 2010 with "Begging for Mercy" as a B-side.

On 24 February 2010, Bullet for My Valentine were on a trip to Los Angeles to shoot a pair of videos: One clip is for the US lead single "Your Betrayal" (released on 12 April 2010), while the other is for the UK lead single "The Last Fight" (released on 12 March 2010). Director Paul R. Brown (best known for his work with Slipknot and Korn) handled both shoots.

In September 2010 on Australian radio, Tuck announced that videos would be in production for the title track and "Bittersweet Memories" The music video for "Bittersweet Memories" was released on 25 November 2010. In a phone interview with drummer, Thomas during February 2011, he stated that the original music videos for "Bittersweet Memories" and Fever were scrapped and that Matt Tuck and Himself wrote the screenplay for what is now "Bittersweet Memories" and that the "Fever" video will not be released because the band felt that it was not suitable enough in quality for the song.

Reception

Upon its release, Fever received positive reviews from critics, as reflected from the achieved score of 63/100 based on 12 critic reviews Metacritic. Allmusic states that on this third disc, the band "consolidate their style and split the difference between their two previous discs" and describes the album as "a solid disc by a group that knows its own strengths".

Fever received positive reviews from Rock Sound ("[...] There's not a single track here that would create an unpleasant contrast") and Kerrang! which gave it a 5/5 K-rating. "It's true that Fever combines the tunefulness of first album The Poison with the velocity of Scream Aim Fire, but it also goes much further than that. Its inspired songwriting, impeccable musicianship and unbridled confidence propel Bullet to a level that they could only point towards previously. As their new day dawns, so their finest hour begins," enthused reviewer Steve Beebee.

Conversely, The New Review gave the album 2.5 out of 5; disappointed of the band's new record, Ben Westerman commented: "[...] As a fan, I'll wait to hear what direction the band takes next, while letting this Fever pass and move on". PopMatters classifies it as a decent album, as it "[...] maintains the level of quality that Scream Aim Fire had, but doesn't advance back to their prior level of excellence. [...] There are more good songs than bad [The Last Fight, Pleasure and Pain and Dignity], but the bad songs are very seriously flawed, and will likely stand out more than the positive aspects of the good songs".

Guitar Edge, on their June 2010 magazine, described Fever as one of Bullet for My Valentine's hardest hitting albums to date. "[...] It combines the infectious melodies and brute force that listeners expect, but with a new, albeit classic, feel. The album is a sonic masterpiece that showcases the band's phenomenal range of talent". Noisecreep did a brief review talking about Fever'''s favorable side:

One of the tracks to receive standout praise, despite not being released as a single, was "Alone". BBC describes it as "[...] the brightest standout, which rocks to a rampaging riff that courses all the way to its core – it's sure to give any listener shivers, such is its magnitude". Billboard fully enjoyed it, saying that "[...] [Alone] offers six minutes of epic ebb-and-flow orchestration"; and among many other critics strongly recommends to listen. Even critics like AbsolutePunk, who really disliked the album, recognized "Alone" as "the standout track" which its "[..] chorus is sing-along-able and the guitar solo is harmonized and completely brutal!" Other impressive songs are the two first singles, the "strong opening of the album", "Your Betrayal" ("[...] The military drumming of Your Betrayal opens the album with infantry intensity and then some wonderfully crisp riffing gives way to Matt Tuck whispering about insanity") and "The Last Fight", they both "[...] demonstrate as much from the outset, presenting fast-paced passages before parrying the momentum into upswings of melody"; and, along with the title-track "Fever", create "a brilliant opening trio". One song, "Bittersweet Memories" did not seem to be as welcomed as all the other tracks, as critics such as BBC classified it as a song "[...] with lyrics of childish despair and forlorn desire, the weakest track here". Or PopMatters'', who also disliked the song, credited it as "[...] absolutely terrible, having more in common with My Chemical Romance than any other band". The song, however, made one of Allmusic's track picks.

Track listing

Personnel

Bullet for My Valentine
Matt Tuck – vocals, rhythm guitar, intro guitar solo on "Your Betrayal", 1st, 3rd and outro guitar solos on "Alone", 1st solo on "Pleasure and Pain" and "Begging for Mercy", guitar solo on "Bittersweet Memories", piano on "The Last Fight" (Acoustic Version); bass (uncredited)
Michael "Moose" Thomas – drums
Michael "Padge" Paget – lead guitar, backing vocals
Jay James – bass (credited but doesn't perform), backing vocals

Production
Don Gilmore – producer
Mark Kiczula – engineering
Ginge Martin – engineering
Jeff Rose – engineering
Tom Manning – assistant recording engineering
Simon Jones – assistant recording engineering
Darren Jones – assistant recording engineering
Kevin Bosley – assistant recording engineering
Chris Lord-Alge – mixer
Keith Armstrong – assistant engineering
Nik Karpen – assistant engineering
Brad Townsend – additional engineering
Andrew Schubert – additional engineering
Ted Jensen – mastering
Martin Dodd – A&R
Michael Tedesco – A&R
P. R. Brown – photography, design, music video direction ("Your Betrayal" and "The Last Fight")

Charts

Weekly charts

Year-end charts

Certifications

Release history

References

External links

Jive Records

Bullet for My Valentine albums
2010 albums
Jive Records albums